3 on 3 NHL Arcade is an NHL-licensed arcade-style hockey sports game for the Xbox 360 and PlayStation 3, using the NHL 09 engine. The game was developed by NHL 09's EA Canada under the EA Sports Freestyle banner.

A demo for the game is available on the PlayStation 3 version of NHL 11 and NHL 12. For NHL 13, there is a code to unlock the whole game.

It is delisted from both digital stores as of 2016 due to expired licenses.

Gameplay

The game is pared down to single contests of three NHL players plus one goalie per team, who are big head versions of their actual selves. The game allows for multiplayer online and off-line play. The game is played on a 'first to...' basis rather than within a set time limit, meaning there can be a near-unlimited amount of periods per match. Powerups can be obtained which can give advantages to either team.

Reception

The game received "mixed or average reviews" on both platforms according to the review aggregation website Metacritic.

References

External links
 

2009 video games
Electronic Arts games
EA Sports games
3 on 3 NHL Arcade
Multiplayer online games
3 on 3 NHL Arcade
PlayStation Network games
Video games developed in Canada
Xbox 360 Live Arcade games
Xbox 360 games